National Review is an American conservative editorial magazine, focusing on news and commentary pieces on political, social, and cultural affairs. The magazine was founded by the author William F. Buckley Jr. in 1955. Its editor-in-chief is Rich Lowry, while the editor is Ramesh Ponnuru.

Since its founding, the magazine has played a significant role in the development of conservatism in the United States, helping to define its boundaries and promoting fusionism while establishing itself as a leading voice on the American right.

The online version, National Review Online, is edited by Philip Klein and includes free content and articles separate from the print edition. The free content is limited, but  National 
Review Plus allows ad-free and unlimited access to both online and print articles.

History

Background 

Before National Reviews founding in 1955, the American right was a largely unorganized collection of people who shared intertwining philosophies but had little opportunity for a united public voice. They wanted to marginalize the antiwar, noninterventionistic views of the Old Right.

In 1953, moderate Republican Dwight D. Eisenhower was president, and many major magazines such as the Saturday Evening Post, Time, and Reader's Digest were strongly conservative and anticommunist, as were many newspapers including the Chicago Tribune and St. Louis Globe-Democrat. A few small-circulation conservative magazines, such as Human Events and The Freeman, preceded National Review in developing Cold War Conservatism in the 1950s.

Early years 
In 1953, Russell Kirk published The Conservative Mind, which traced an intellectual bloodline from Edmund Burke to the Old Right in the early 1950s. This challenged the notion among intellectuals that no coherent conservative tradition existed in the United States.

A young William F. Buckley Jr. was greatly influenced by Kirk's concepts. Buckley had money; his father grew rich from oil fields in Mexico. He first tried to purchase Human Events, but was turned down. He then met Willi Schlamm, the experienced editor of The Freeman; they would spend the next two years raising the $300,000 necessary to start their own weekly magazine, originally to be called National Weekly. (A magazine holding the trademark to the name prompted the change to National Review.) The statement of intentions read:

Middle-of-the-Road, qua Middle of the Road, is politically, intellectually, and morally repugnant. We shall recommend policies for the simple reason that we consider them right (rather than “non-controversial”); and we consider them right because they are based on principles we deem right (rather than on popularity polls)... The New Deal revolution, for instance, could hardly have happened save for the cumulative impact of The Nation and The New Republic, and a few other publications, on several American college generations during the twenties and thirties.

Contributors 
On November 19, 1955, Buckley's magazine began to take shape. Buckley assembled an eclectic group of writers: traditionalists, Catholic intellectuals, libertarians and ex-Communists. The group included: Revilo P. Oliver, Russell Kirk, James Burnham, Frank Meyer, and Willmoore Kendall, Catholics L. Brent Bozell and Garry Wills. The former Time editor Whittaker Chambers, who had been a Communist spy in the 1930s and was now intensely anti-Communist, became a senior editor. In the magazine's founding statement Buckley wrote:

The launching of a conservative weekly journal of opinion in a country widely assumed to be a bastion of conservatism at first glance looks like a work of supererogation, rather like publishing a royalist weekly within the walls of Buckingham Palace. It is not that of course; if National Review is superfluous, it is so for very different reasons: It stands athwart history, yelling Stop, at a time when no other is inclined to do so, or to have much patience with those who so urge it.

As editors and contributors, Buckley especially sought out intellectuals who were ex-Communists or had once worked on the far Left, including Whittaker Chambers, William Schlamm, John Dos Passos, Frank Meyer and James Burnham. When James Burnham became one of the original senior editors, he urged the adoption of a more pragmatic editorial position that would extend the influence of the magazine toward the political center. Smant (1991) finds that Burnham overcame sometimes heated opposition from other members of the editorial board (including Meyer, Schlamm, William Rickenbacker, and the magazine's publisher William A. Rusher), and had a significant effect on both the editorial policy of the magazine and on the thinking of Buckley himself.

Mission to conservatives 
National Review aimed to make conservative ideas respectable, in an age when the dominant view of conservative thought was, as expressed by Columbia professor Lionel Trilling:

[L]iberalism is not only the dominant but even the sole intellectual tradition. For it is the plain fact that nowadays there are no conservative or reactionary ideas in general circulation... the conservative impulse and the reactionary impulse do not... express themselves in ideas but only... in irritable mental gestures which seek to resemble ideas.

William Buckley Jr. said of the purpose of National Review:

[National Review] stands athwart history, yelling Stop, at a time when no one is inclined to do so, or to have much patience with those who so urge it… it is out of place because, in its maturity, literate America rejected conservatism in favor of radical social experimentation…since ideas rule the world, the ideologues, having won over the intellectual class, simply walked in and started to…run just about everything. There never was an age of conformity quite like this one, or a camaraderie quite like the Liberals’.

National Review promoted Barry Goldwater heavily during the early 1960s. Buckley and others involved with the magazine took a major role in the "Draft Goldwater" movement in 1960 and the 1964 presidential campaign. National Review spread his vision of conservatism throughout the country.

The early National Review faced occasional defections from both left and right. Garry Wills broke with National Review and became a liberal commentator. Buckley's brother-in-law, L. Brent Bozell Jr. left and started the short-lived traditionalist Catholic magazine, Triumph in 1966.

Defining the boundaries of conservatism 

Buckley and Meyer promoted the idea of enlarging the boundaries of conservatism through fusionism, whereby different schools of conservatives, including libertarians, would work together to combat what were seen as their common opponents.

Buckley and his editors used his magazine to define the boundaries of conservatism—and to exclude people or ideas or groups they considered unworthy of the conservative title. Therefore, they attacked the John Birch Society, George Wallace, and anti-Semites.

Buckley's goal was to increase the respectability of the conservative movement; as Rich Lowry noted: "Mr. Buckley's first great achievement was to purge the American right of its kooks. He marginalized the anti-Semites, the John Birchers, the nativists and their sort."

In 1957, National Review editorialized in favor of white leadership in the South, arguing that "the central question that emerges... is whether the White community in the South is entitled to take such measures as are necessary to prevail, politically and culturally, in areas where it does not predominate numerically? The sobering answer is Yes – the White community is so entitled because, for the time being, it is the advanced race." By the 1970s National Review advocated colorblind policies and the end of affirmative action.

In the late 1960s, the magazine denounced segregationist George Wallace, who ran in Democratic primaries in 1964 and 1972 and made an independent run for president in 1968. During the 1950s, Buckley had worked to remove anti-Semitism from the conservative movement and barred holders of those views from working for National Review. In 1962 Buckley denounced Robert W. Welch Jr. and the John Birch Society as "far removed from common sense" and urged the Republican Party to purge itself of Welch's influence.

After Goldwater 
After Goldwater was defeated by Lyndon Johnson in 1964, Buckley and National Review continued to champion the idea of a conservative movement, which was increasingly embodied in Ronald Reagan. Reagan, a longtime subscriber to National Review, first became politically prominent during Goldwater's campaign. National Review supported his challenge to President Gerald Ford in 1976 and his successful 1980 campaign.

During the 1980s National Review called for tax cuts, supply-side economics, the Strategic Defense Initiative, and support for President Reagan's foreign policy against the Soviet Union. The magazine criticized the Welfare state and would support the Welfare reform proposals of the 1990s. The magazine also regularly criticized President Bill Clinton. It first embraced, then rejected, Pat Buchanan in his political campaigns. A lengthy 1996 National Review editorial called for a "movement toward" drug legalization.

In 1985, National Review and Buckley were represented by attorney J. Daniel Mahoney during the magazine's $16 million libel suit against The Spotlight.

Political views and content 
Victor Davis Hanson, a regular contributor since 2001, sees a broad spectrum of conservative and anti-liberal contributors:

The magazine has been described as "the bible of American conservatism".

Donald Trump 
In 2015, the magazine published an editorial entitled "Against Trump," calling him a "philosophically unmoored political opportunist" and announcing its opposition to his candidacy for the Republican nomination for president. Since Trump's election to the presidency, the National Review editorial board has continued to criticize him.

However, contributors to National Review and National Review Online take a variety of positions on Trump.  Lowry and Hanson support him, while National Review contributors such as Ramesh Ponnuru and Jonah Goldberg have remained critical of Trump. In a Washington Post feature on conservative magazines, T.A. Frank noted: "From the perspective of a reader, these tensions make National Review as lively as it has been in a long time."

National Review Online 
A popular feature of National Review is the web version of the magazine, National Review Online ("N.R.O."), which includes a digital version of the magazine, with articles updated daily by National Review writers, and conservative blogs. The on-line version is called N.R.O. to distinguish it from the paper magazine. It also features free articles, though these deviate in content from its print magazine. The site's editor is Phillip Klein, who replaced Charles C. W. Cooke.

Each day, the site posts new content consisting of conservative, libertarian, and neoconservative opinion articles, including some syndicated columns, and news features.

It also features two blogs:
 The Corner – postings from a select group of the site's editors and affiliated writers discussing the issues of the day
 Bench Memos – legal and judicial news and commentary

Markos Moulitsas, who runs the liberal Daily Kos web-site, told reporters in August 2007 that he does not read conservative blogs, with the exception of those on N.R.O.: "I do like the blogs at the National Review—I do think their writers are the best in the [conservative] blogosphere," he said.

National Review Institute 
The N.R.I. works in policy development and helping establish new advocates in the conservative movement. National Review Institute was founded by William F. Buckley Jr. in 1991 to engage in policy development, public education, and advocacy that would advance the conservative principles he championed.

In 2019, the Whittaker Chambers family had NRI stop an award in Chambers' name following award to people whom the family found objectionable.

Finances 
As with most political opinion magazines in the United States, National Review carries little corporate advertising. The magazine stays afloat from subscription fees, donations, and black-tie fundraisers around the country. The magazine also sponsors cruises featuring National Review editors and contributors as lecturers.

Buckley said in 2005 that the magazine had lost about $25,000,000 over 50 years.

Presidential primary endorsements 
National Review sometimes endorses a candidate during the primary election season. Editors at National Review have said, "Our guiding principle has always been to select the most conservative viable candidate." This statement echoes what has come to be called "The Buckley Rule". In a 1967 interview, in which he was asked about the choice of presidential candidate, Buckley said, "The wisest choice would be the one who would win... I'd be for the most right, viable candidate who could win."

The following candidates were officially endorsed by National Review:

 1956: Dwight Eisenhower
 1960: No endorsement
 1964: Barry Goldwater
 1968: Richard Nixon
 1972: John M. Ashbrook
 1976: Ronald Reagan
 1980: Ronald Reagan
 1984: Ronald Reagan
 1988: George H. W. Bush
 1992: No endorsement
 1996: No endorsement
 2000: George W. Bush
 2004: No endorsement
 2008: Mitt Romney
 2012: No endorsement
 2016: Ted Cruz
 2020: No endorsement

Editors and contributors 

The magazine's current editor-in-chief is Rich Lowry. Many of the magazine's commentators are affiliated with think-tanks such as The Heritage Foundation and American Enterprise Institute. Prominent guest authors have included Newt Gingrich, Mitt Romney, Peter Thiel, and Ted Cruz in the on-line and paper edition.

Notable current contributors 
Current and past contributors to National Review (N.R.) magazine, National Review Online (N.R.O.), or both:

 Elliott Abrams
 Michael D. Aeschliman
 Richard Brookhiser, senior editor
 Charles C. W. Cooke, editor of N.R.O..
 Frederick H. Fleitz
 John Fund, N.R.O. national-affairs columnist
 Jim Geraghty
 Paul Johnson
 Roger Kimball
 Larry Kudlow
 Stanley Kurtz
 Yuval Levin
 James Lileks
 Rob Long, N.R. contributing editor
 Kathryn Jean Lopez
 Rich Lowry, N.R. editor
 Andrew C. McCarthy
 John McCormack, N.R. Washington, D.C. correspondent
 John J. Miller, N.R. national political reporter
 Stephen Moore, financial columnist
 Deroy Murdock
 Jay Nordlinger
 John O'Sullivan, N.R. editor-at-large
 Ramesh Ponnuru
 David Pryce-Jones
 Tom Rogan
 Noah Rothman
 Reihan Salam
 Armond White

Notable past contributors 

 Jonah Goldberg
 David French
 Renata Adler
 Steve Allen
 Wick Allison
 W. H. Auden
 Edward C. Banfield
 Jacques Barzun
 Peter L. Berger
 Tom Bethell
 Allan Bloom
 George Borjas
 Robert Bork
 L. Brent Bozell Jr.
 Peter Brimelow
 Pat Buchanan
 Jed Babbin
 Myrna Blyth
 Christopher Buckley
 William F. Buckley Jr., founder
 James Burnham
 John R. Chamberlain
 Whittaker Chambers
 Mona Charen
 Shannen W. Coffin
 Robert Conquest
 Richard Corliss
 Robert Costa
 Ann Coulter
 Arlene Croce
 Ted Cruz
 Guy Davenport
 John Derbyshire
 Joan Didion
 John Dos Passos
 Rod Dreher
 Dinesh D'Souza
 John Gregory Dunne
 Max Eastman
 Eric Ehrmann
 Thomas Fleming
 Samuel T. Francis
 Milton Friedman
 David Frum
 Francis Fukuyama
 Eugene Genovese
 Paul Gigot
 Nathan Glazer
 Stuart Goldman
 Paul Gottfried
 Mark M. Goldblatt
 Michael Graham
 Ethan Gutmann
 Ernest van den Haag
 Victor Davis Hanson
 Jeffrey Hart
 Henry Hazlitt
 Will Herberg
 Christopher Hitchens
 Harry V. Jaffa
 Arthur Jensen
 John Keegan
 Willmoore Kendall
 Hugh Kenner
 Florence King
 Phil Kerpen
 Russell Kirk
 Charles Krauthammer
 Irving Kristol
 Dave Kopel
 Erik von Kuehnelt-Leddihn
 Michael Ledeen
 Fritz Leiber
 John Leonard
 Mark Levin
 John Lukacs
 Arnold Lunn
 Richard Lynn
 Alasdair MacIntyre
 Harvey C. Mansfield
 Malachi Martin
 Frank Meyer
 Scott McConnell
 Forrest McDonald
 Ludwig von Mises
 Alice-Leone Moats
 Raymond Moley
 Thomas Molnar
 Charles Murray
 Richard Neuhaus
 Robert Nisbet
 Michael Novak
 Robert Novak
 Michael Oakeshott
 Kate O'Beirne
 Conor Cruise O'Brien
 Revilo P. Oliver
 Thomas Pangle
 Isabel Paterson
 Ezra Pound
 Paul Craig Roberts
 Murray Rothbard
 William A. Rusher, publisher, 1957–88
 J. Philippe Rushton
 Steve Sailer
 Pat Sajak
 Catherine Seipp
 Daniel Seligman
 Ben Shapiro
 John Simon
 Joseph Sobran
 Thomas Sowell
 Mark Steyn
 Whit Stillman
 Theodore Sturgeon
 Mark Steyn
 Thomas Szasz
 Allen Tate
 Jared Taylor
 Terry Teachout
 Taki Theodoracopulos
 Katherine Timpf
 Ralph de Toledano
 Auberon Waugh
 Evelyn Waugh
 Richard M. Weaver
 Robert Weissberg
 Frederick Wilhelmsen
 George F. Will
 Kevin D. Williamson
 Garry Wills
 James Q. Wilson
 Tom Wolfe
 Byron York
 R. V. Young

Washington editors 
 L. Brent Bozell Jr.
 Neal B. Freeman
 George Will, 1973–76
 Neal B. Freeman, 1978–81
 John McLaughlin, 1981–89
 William McGurn, 1989–1992
 Kate O'Beirne
 Robert Costa, 2012–13
 Eliana Johnson, 2014–16

Controversies

Barack Obama 

In June 2008, six days after Hillary Clinton conceded to Barack Obama in the Democratic primary, National Review correspondent Jim Geraghty published an article encouraging the Obama campaign to release the candidate's birth certificate in order "to squash all the conspiracy theories once and for all." Geraghty's column notes that it was unlikely that Obama was born in Kenya. Attorney Loren Collins, who has tracked the origins of birther movement for years, says that Geraghty may have "unwittingly shined a national spotlight on a fringe internet theory." Geraghty's article "became fodder for cable television." In a 2009 editorial, the National Review editorial board called conspiracies about Obama's citizenship "untrue," writing: "Like Bruce Springsteen, he has a lot of bad political ideas; but he was born in the U.S.A."

One National Review article said that Obama's parents could be communists because “for a white woman to marry a black man in 1958, or ’60, there was almost inevitably a connection to explicit Communist politics”.

As of 2018, Dinesh D'Souza was on the National Review masthead, despite stirring controversy for a number of years making inflammatory remarks and promoting conspiracy theories. D'Souza was no longer on the magazine's masthead in 2020. In comments that earned rebukes from National Review colleagues, D'Souza said that billionaire George Soros was a "collection boy for Hitler and the Nazis," attacked Roy Moore accuser Beverly Young Nelson, said that accusations against Roy Moore were “most likely fabricated,” and described Rosa Parks as an "overrated Democrat".

Climate change 
According to Philip Bump of The Washington Post, National Review "has regularly criticized and rejected the scientific consensus on climate change". In 2015, the magazine published an intentionally deceptive graph that suggested that there was no climate change. The graph set the lower and upper bounds of the chart at -10 and 110 degree Fahrenheit and zoomed out so as to obscure warming trends.

In 2017, National Review published an article alleging that a top NOAA scientist claimed that the National Oceanic and Atmospheric Administration engaged in data manipulation and rushed a study based on faulty data in order to influence the Paris climate negotiations. The article largely repeated allegations made in the Daily Mail without independent verification. The scientist in question later rejected the claims made by National Review, noting that he did not accuse NOAA of data manipulation but instead raised concerns about "the way data was handled, documented and stored, raising issues of transparency and availability".

In 2014, climate scientist Michael E. Mann sued the National Review after columnist Mark Steyn accused Mann of fraud and referenced a quote from Competitive Enterprise Institute writer Rand Simberg that called Mann "the Jerry Sandusky of climate science, except that instead of molesting children, he has molested and tortured data." Civil liberties organizations such as the ACLU and the Electronic Frontier Foundation and several publications such as The Washington Post expressed support for National Review in the lawsuit, filing amicus briefs in their defense.

Ann Coulter 9/11 column 
Two days after the 9/11 attacks, National Review published a column by Ann Coulter in which she wrote of Muslims, "This is no time to be precious about locating the exact individuals directly involved in this particular terrorist attack. We should invade their countries, kill their leaders and convert them to Christianity. We weren't punctilious about locating and punishing only Hitler and his top officers. We carpet-bombed German cities; we killed civilians. That's war. And this is war." National Review later called the column a "mistake" and fired Coulter as a contributing editor.

Jeffrey Epstein 
In 2019, The New York Times reported that National Review was one of three news outlets (along with Forbes and HuffPost) that had published stories written by Jeffrey Epstein's publicists. The National Review article was written by Christina Galbraith, Epstein's publicist at the time the article was published in 2013. The National Review bio for Galbraith described her as a science writer. The National Review retracted the article in July 2019 with apologies and spoke of new methods being used to better filter freelance content.

References

Bibliography 
 Allitt, Patrick. The Conservatives: Ideas and Personalities Throughout American History (2010) excerpt and text search
 Bayley, Edwin R. Joe McCarthy and the Press (University of Wisconsin Press, 1981).
 Birzer, Bradley J. Russell Kirk: American Conservative (University Press of Kentucky, 2015).
 Bogus, Carl T. Buckley: William F. Buckley Jr. and the Rise of American Conservatism (2011)
 Bridges, Linda and Coyne, John R., Jr. Strictly Right: William F. Buckley Jr. and the American Conservative Movement (John Wiley and Sons, 2007).
 Critchlow, Donald T. The Conservative Ascendancy: How the Right Made Political History (2007)
 Del Visco, Stephen. "Yellow peril, red scare: race and communism in National Review." Ethnic and Racial Studies 42.4 (2019): 626–644.
 Frisk, David B. If Not Us, Who?: William Rusher, National Review, and the Conservative Movement (2011)
 Frohnen, Bruce et al. eds. American Conservatism: An Encyclopedia (2006) 
 Hart, Jeffrey. The Making of the American Conservative Mind: The National Review and Its Times (2005), a view from the inside
 Hemmer, Nicole. Messengers of the Right: Conservative Media and the Transformation of American Politics (University of Pennsylvania Press, 2016). 
 Johnston, Savannah Eccles. "The Rise of Illiberal Conservatism: Immigration and Nationhood at National Review." American Political Thought 10.2 (2021): 190–216.
 Judis, John B. William F. Buckley, Jr.: Patron Saint of the Conservatives (2001) 
 Nash, George. The Conservative Intellectual Movement in America Since 1945 (2006; 1st ed. 1978)
 Nemeth, Julian. "The Passion of William F. Buckley: Academic Freedom, Conspiratorial Conservatism, and the Rise of the Postwar Right." Journal of American Studies 54.2 (2020): 323–350.
 Owen, Christopher H. Heaven Can Indeed Fall: The Life of Willmoore Kendall (Rowman & Littlefield, 2021).
 Schneider, Gregory. The Conservative Century: From Reaction to Revolution (2009)
 Smant, Kevin J. Principles and Heresies: Frank S. Meyer and the Shaping of the American Conservative Movement (2002)
 Walsh, David Austin. "The Right-Wing Popular Front: The Far Right and American Conservatism in the 1950s." Journal of American History 107.2 (2020): 411–432.

External links 
 
 NRI, National Review Institute
 

1955 establishments in New York (state)
Biweekly magazines published in the United States
Climate change denial
Conservative magazines published in the United States
Magazines established in 1955
Magazines published in New York City
New Right organizations (United States)
News magazines published in the United States
Political magazines published in the United States
William F. Buckley Jr.